Pedro Guevara y Valenzuela (February 23, 1879 – January 19, 1938), was a Filipino soldier, lawyer, legislator, and Spanish writer who became Resident Commissioner of the Philippines during the American Occupation.

Early life
Pedro Guevara was born in Santa Cruz, Laguna, Philippines on February 23, 1879 to Miguel Guevara and María Valenzuela.

Education
Guevara attended Ateneo Municipal de Manila and graduated from Colegio de San Juan de Letran, Manila in 1896.

Philippine Revolution
Guevara joined the Filipino forces during the Philippine Revolution and assisted in promoting the peace agreement of the Biak na Bato at San Miguel, Bulacan, in 1897. He later rejoined the Filipino forces during the revolution, and also served throughout the Spanish–American War and the Philippine–American War, attaining the rank of lieutenant colonel. He was the aide and private secretary to General Juan Cailles.

Political career
Later, Guevara became a journalist for the Spanish language newspaper Soberania Nacional and Vidas Filipinas. He entered politics as a municipal councilor of San Felipe Neri, Rizal (present-day city of Mandaluyong) in 1907. He studied law at La Jurisprudencia and became a lawyer in private practice. He later became a member of the Philippine House of Representatives from the 2nd district of La Laguna from 1909 to 1912 and a member of the Philippine Senate from the 4th senatorial district from 1916 to 1923. In 1921, Guevara was chair of the Philippine delegation to the Far Eastern Bar Conference at Beijing, China.

He gave up his Senate seat in 1923, less than two years before his second term expired, as he was elected as a Nationalist resident commissioner to the House of Representatives of the United States Congress. He would serve for four three-year terms from March 4, 1923 to February 14, 1936. During this time, Guevara worked tirelessly for the approval of the Tydings–McDuffie Act, which would establish the Commonwealth of the Philippines and eventually its independence in 10 years. Later, he served as delegate of Laguna during the Constitutional Convention of 1934 which framed the 1935 Philippine Constitution. His term ended on February 14, 1936, when a successor qualified in accordance with the newly-established Commonwealth of the Philippines was selected.

Death
Upon retirement, Guevara resumed his law practice. He died of a heart attack in Manila on January 19, 1938, and was buried at the Manila North Cemetery. In 1993, his remains were moved to Loyola Memorial Park in Marikina.

Gallery

See also
Laguna State Polytechnic University
List of Asian Americans and Pacific Islands Americans in the United States Congress

External links

1879 births
1938 deaths
Ateneo de Manila University alumni
Burials at the Manila North Cemetery
Colegio de San Juan de Letran alumni
Members of the House of Representatives of the Philippines from Laguna (province)
Members of the United States Congress of Filipino descent
Metro Manila city and municipal councilors
Nacionalista Party politicians
People of the Philippine Revolution
People of the Philippine–American War
People from Laguna (province)
20th-century Filipino lawyers
People from Mandaluyong
People from Manila
Resident Commissioners of the Philippines
Senators of the 4th Philippine Legislature
Senators of the 5th Philippine Legislature
Members of the Philippine Legislature
Spanish-language writers of the Philippines